Hakea aculeata, commonly known as the column hakea, is a vulnerable species of the family Proteaceae found in the Wheatbelt region of Western Australia. An unusual sculptural species with dense  columns of prickly foliage and plentiful clusters of strongly scented blooms in spring.

Description
The smaller branches have long soft hairs lying on the surface. The cream, yellow and red flowers appear in profusion in axillary clusters in the upper smaller branches.

Taxonomy and naming
Hakea aculeata was first formally described in 1979 by Alex George and the description was published in Nuytsia from a specimen he collected near Cunderdin. The specific epithet (aculeata) is derived from the Latin word aculeatus meaning "prickly" or "sharp-pointed".

Distribution and habitat
A rare species growing in southwestern Western Australia  around Brookton, Cunderdin, Merredin, Tammin and Quairading.
Hakea aculeata grows in sandy loam in heath and open scrubland. An attractive feature plant requiring a sunny aspect, good drainage and is frost and drought tolerant.

Conservation status
Hakea aculeata is classified as "Threatened Flora (Declared Rare Flora — Extant)" by the Western Australian Government Department of Parks and Wildlife. An endangered species known only from about 19 populations.

References

External links

 Flora of Australia Online - Hakea aculeata
 FloraBase: The Western Australian Flora
 Australian Native Plants Society (Australia), The genus Hakea

aculeata
Eudicots of Western Australia
Trees of Mediterranean climate
Plants described in 1979